The First Universalist Church of Cedar Rapids, also called the Peoples Church Unitarian Universalist is listed on the National Register of Historic Places. Built in 1875, it served the Unitarian Universalist community of Cedar Rapids, Iowa, USA, for more than 135 years. Because of the high cost of upkeep and diminishing membership, the congregation voted to sell the building and grounds in May 2010. It was demolished in October 2011.

See also
Universalist Church (Mitchellville, Iowa), another Universalist Church on the National Register of Historic Places in Iowa.

References

Churches completed in 1875
Churches in Cedar Rapids, Iowa
Unitarian Universalist churches in Iowa
National Register of Historic Places in Cedar Rapids, Iowa
Churches on the National Register of Historic Places in Iowa
Universalist Church of America churches
Demolished buildings and structures in Iowa
Buildings and structures demolished in 2011